Yusuf Aydin (born 13 September 2000) is a Turkish international rugby league footballer who plays as a  for the Hull KR in the Betfred Super League.

He has previous spent time on loan from Leeds at Wakefield Trinity in the Betfred Super League.

Background
Aydin was born in Wakefield, West Yorkshire, England and is of Turkish heritage.

Career

International
Aydin is a Turkish international.

2020
Aydin made his professional debut in round 12 of the 2020 Super League season for Wakefield against Hull FC.

References

External links
Wakefield Trinity profile
SL profile

2000 births
Living people
English people of Turkish descent
English rugby league players
Hull Kingston Rovers players
Leeds Rhinos players
Rugby league props
Rugby league players from Wakefield
Turkey national rugby league team players
Wakefield Trinity players
York City Knights players